is a train station located in Ōki, Fukuoka.

Lines 
Nishi-Nippon Railroad
Tenjin Ōmuta Line

Platforms

Adjacent stations

Surrounding area
 Kunitake Clinic
 Ishikawa Food shop
 Creek Nosatoishimaruyama Park
 Mishima Shrine
 Ōmizo Post Office
 Ōmizo Elementary School

Railway stations in Fukuoka Prefecture
Railway stations in Japan opened in 1937